The siege of Naples was a successful siege of Naples by the Ostrogothic leader Totila in 542–543 AD. After crushing the Byzantine armies at Faventia and Mucellium, Totila marched south towards Naples, held by the general Conon with 1,000 men. A large-scale relief effort by the newly appointed magister militum Demetrius from Sicily was intercepted and almost entirely destroyed by Gothic warships. A second effort, again under Demetrius, likewise failed when strong winds forced the fleet's vessels to beach, where they were attacked and overrun by the Gothic army. Knowing the dire situation of the city's defenders, Totila promised the garrison safe passage if they surrendered. Pressed by famine and demoralized by the failure of the relief efforts, Conon accepted, and in late March or early April 543, Naples surrendered. The defenders were well treated by Totila, and the Byzantine garrison was allowed safe departure, but the city walls were partly razed.

Sources

542
543
Naples
Military history of Naples
Gothic War (535–554)
Naples 542
Naples 542
Naples
540s in the Byzantine Empire
540s